During the 2003–04 season, Rotherham United participated in the Football League First Division.

Season summary
Rotherham slumped somewhat following last season's comfortable midtable finish and ended the season in 17th, three points from the relegation zone.

Final league table

First-team squad
Squad at end of season

Left club during season

References

Notes

Rotherham United F.C. seasons
Rotherham United